Greenwood Cemetery is a cemetery in the Pittsburgh suburb of O'Hara Township, Pennsylvania, United States.

The cemetery was opened in 1874  and is located approximately six miles northeast of Downtown Pittsburgh at 321 Kittanning Pike (zip code 15215).

Notables interred here include Pulitzer Prize winning playwright August Wilson. Wilson's 1995 play Seven Guitars uses the cemetery as a setting.

See also
 List of cemeteries in the United States

References

External links
 
 
  

History of Pittsburgh
Cemeteries in Allegheny County, Pennsylvania
1874 establishments in Pennsylvania
Cemeteries established in the 1870s